Bond Head may refer to:

Francis Bond Head (1793–1875), Lieutenant-Governor of Upper Canada during the Rebellion of 1837
Bond Head, a rural community in Clarington, Durham, Ontario, Canada
Bond Head, a community in Bradford West Gwillimbury, Ontario, Canada

See also
 Band head